Nantucket Shoals is an area of dangerously shallow water in the Atlantic Ocean that extends from Nantucket Island, Massachusetts, eastward for  and southeastward for ; in places water depth can be as shallow as . Depth soundings are unpredictable due to the constant change caused by strong currents, which are rotary rather than reversing. The shoals lie just off of a major transatlantic shipping lane. Numerous ships have been wrecked here, most recently and notably the oil tanker Argo Merchant in December 1976. Until 1983, the edge of the shoals was guarded by the Nantucket Lightship.

Nantucket Shoals is made up of the following features: 
Asia Rip
Davis Bank
Fishing Rip
Middle Rip
Phelps Bank

According to the 2010 edition of the United States Coast Pilot, the International Maritime Organization has established an "area to be avoided" for the Nantucket Shoals. Vessels transporting oil or hazardous materials and vessels of more than 1,000 gross tons should avoid the area bounded by the points in the below table.

References

External links

Landforms of the Atlantic Ocean
Landforms of Nantucket, Massachusetts
Shoals of the United States